Monaghan is the county town of County Monaghan, Ireland. It also provides the name of its civil parish and barony.

The population of the town as of the 2016 census was 7,678. The town is on the N2 road from Dublin to Derry and Letterkenny.

Etymology
The Irish name Muineachán derives from a diminutive plural form of the Irish word muine meaning "brake" (a thickly overgrown area) or sometimes "hillock". The Irish historian and writer Patrick Weston Joyce interpreted this as "a place full of little hills or brakes". Monaghan County Council's preferred interpretation is "land of the little hills", a reference to the numerous drumlins in the area.

History

Early history
The Menapii Celtic tribe are specifically named on Ptolemy's 150 AD map of Ireland, where they located their first colony – Menapia – on the Leinster coast circa 216 BC. They later settled around Lough Erne, becoming known as the Fir Manach, and giving their name to Fermanagh and Monaghan. Mongán mac Fiachnai, a 7th-century King of Ulster, is the protagonist of several legends linking him with Manannan mac Lir. They spread across Ireland, evolving into historic Irish (also Scottish and Manx) clans.

The Battle of Clontibret, fought between the forces of The Earl of Tyrone, An Ó Néill (The O'Neill), of Tír Eoghain, and the English Crown, was fought in northern County Monaghan in May 1595. The territory of Monaghan had earlier been wrested from the control of the MacMahon sept in 1591, when the leader of the MacMahons was hanged by authority of the Dublin government; this was one of the events that led to the Nine Years War and the Tudor conquest of Ireland.

On the Hill of Lech, the Hill of the Stone, was the inauguration stone of the Mac Mahons. It overlooks Ballagh Lough to the west, which was once known as Lough Leck. It is said to be built into the wall of a mill.

In 1801, Monaghan Town, along with the rest of the Rossmore Estate, became the property of the Westenra family. The Rossmore Estate was inherited in August of that year by Warner Westenra, 2nd Baron Rossmore, from his uncle. The Westenra family remained as the principal landlords of Monaghan town up into the early twentieth-century. Their 'ancestral seat' was established at Rossmore Castle (also known as Rossmore Park), a large country house mainly built in stages during the nineteenth-century on the south-western edge of Monaghan Town. The castle was mainly built in the neo-Jacobean style of architecture.

 The castle stood on the south-western edge of Monaghan town and was abandoned just after the Second World War. The ruins of the castle were blown up by Monaghan County Council in 1974.

Transport
The Ulster Canal through Monaghan linking the River Blackwater at Moy with the River Erne near Clones was built between 1825 and 1842. By the time it was completed, competition in the form of the Ulster Railway from Belfast to Clones was already under construction. The canal was never a commercial success and was formally abandoned in 1931.

It became part of the Great Northern Railway in 1876. The partition of Ireland in 1922 turned the boundary with County Armagh into an international frontier, after which trains were routinely delayed by customs inspections. CIÉ took over the remaining section of line between Clones, Monaghan and Glaslough in 1958 but withdrew goods services between Monaghan and Glaslough in 1959 and between Clones and Monaghan in 1960, leaving Monaghan with no railway service.

Twentieth century
In February 1919 the first self-consciously proclaimed soviet in the United Kingdom was established at Monaghan Lunatic Asylum. This led to the claim by Joseph Devlin in the House of Commons of the United Kingdom that "the only successfully conducted institutions in Ireland are the lunatic asylums".

On 17 May 1974 an Ulster loyalist car bomb exploded in the Friday evening rush hour, killing seven people. It was detonated outside Greacen's public house on North Road in a car that had been stolen earlier that afternoon in Portadown, Northern Ireland. The bomb killed Paddy Askin (44), Thomas Campbell (52), Thomas Croarkin (36), Archie Harper (73, died four days later), Jack Travers (28), Peggy White (45) and George Williamson (72). It also injured scores of civilians and caused extensive damage to the fabric of the town with North Road and Mill Street among the areas worst affected. This was one of the few car bombings in the Republic during The Troubles, which were centred on Northern Ireland; three other bombs exploded on the same day in Dublin in what became known as the Dublin and Monaghan bombings. The Ulster loyalist paramilitary group Ulster Volunteer Force (UVF) claimed responsibility in 1993.

A monument in memory of the victims was unveiled by the eighth President of Ireland Mary McAleese on 17 May 2004, on the occasion of the 30th anniversary of the atrocity. The sandstone and metal column containing seven light wells bearing the names of each of the seven victims of the bombing was designed by Ciaran O'Cearnaigh and stands as a reminder of one of the darkest days in Ireland's modern history.

Culture

Monaghan continues to host one of Ireland's most prestigious and established blues festivals, the Harvest Time Blues Festival. It is hosted every September across Monaghan town.

The Fiddler of Oriel Muineachán Competition (also known as Féile Oriel) first held in 1969 returned in 2009 to celebrate its fortieth anniversary. It is held every May Bank Holiday weekend.

Founded in 1974, Monaghan County Museum is recognised as one of the leading provincial museums in Ireland, with a prestigious Council of Europe Award conferred in 1980, among others, to its credit. The museum is located in a mid-Victorian stone building of three stories, formerly two separate town houses, on Hill Street. It aims to acquaint its visitors with the history of County Monaghan and its people.

The Garage Theatre is an arts facility located on the Monaghan Education Campus. It hosts a wide range of activities including drama, music, dance and film.

The town is home to Monaghan United Football Club, formerly of the League of Ireland Premier Division.

Local government
Local issues are dealt with by the Monaghan Municipal Council which elects six members, all of which are elected as members of Monaghan County Council. The town forms part of the Monaghan ward for local elections for elections to Monaghan County Council and part of the Cavan–Monaghan constituency for elections to Dáil Éireann.

The largest party on the municipal council is Sinn Féin, which holds two of six seats. Fine Gael and Fianna Fáil each hold one seat and there are two independent members.

Town layout and architecture
The centre of the town is made up of four interconnecting squares: Market Square (or Street), Church Square, The Diamond and Old Cross Square.

Dating from the seventeenth century, the oldest remaining architectural feature in Monaghan town is the "Old Cross" – located in Old Cross Square. It is not fully agreed that it is in fact a cross, but may in fact have been a seventeenth-century sundial. It was originally located in the Diamond, the traditional centre of the town, and was used as a hiring cross and for the attaching of proclamations. It was moved to its present location in 1876 to allow for the construction of the Rossmore Memorial. Two landmark buildings remain from the eighteenth century, Aviemore House (built in 1760) on Mill Street and the "extremely elegant" Market House (from 1792) on Market Square.

Monaghan is notable for the quality of its nineteenth-century architecture, which adds a sense of dignity to the attractive town centre and its environs. Of its Victorian buildings, the Monaghan Courthouse on Church Square, designed by Joseph Welland and built in 1830, is the most stately. With its sandstone facade of Doric columns supporting a pediment that bears the royal arms of the House of Hanover, Monaghan Courthouse constitutes an integral part of Church Square.

The Rossmore Memorial in The Diamond was built in 1876 as a memorial to The 4th Baron Rossmore, who died after a hunting accident at Windsor Castle in 1874. This Victorian monument, described by architectural historian C.E.B. Brett as "formidable and striking" is octagonal in shape, with central marble columns supporting a fountain. Around it, the eight grey columns support the pinnacled superstructure which rises to a dome. The dome is surmounted by a spire supported by yet more columns. The letters of Rossmore (also eight in number) are spaced out around the monument.

The Gothic-Revival St Macartan's Cathedral by James Joseph McCarthy is recognised as being "one of McCarthy's best works: an excellent example of the High Victorian ecclesiastical style at its best, rich without ever being over-ornate". The building comprises a delicate rose window and an impressive soaring spire and took over thirty years to complete. Construction work began in 1861 and the cathedral was finally dedicated in 1892. Originally the nave was intended to be two bays longer but lack of funds meant that the design was cut back. The Cathedral sits on an imposing site overlooking the town. Occupying a similarly commanding site on the opposite side of the town is St Macartan's College for boys (from 1840), a 17-bay classical structure with a bell tower and private chapel, by the Newry-born architect Thomas Duff.

Church Square is very much an environment in which the civic pride of Victorian improvers lives on in the satisfying essay in the Ruskinian-Gothic style that is the Bank of Ireland building, as much as in the peaks of St. Patrick's Church of Ireland and the Dawson Obelisk. One of the most interesting aspects of Monaghan's Victorian architectural heritage, which also includes the former railway station, the Orange Hall on North Road and the Westenra Hotel on the Diamond, is the rounded corners that connect the town's buildings from one street or square to the next. This practice of rounding corners in order to open up panoramic vistas was carried out with unprecedented frequency in the town of Monaghan, and is still reflected today in the edifices of The Diamond, Church Square and Mill Street, helping to secure Monaghan's status as one of Ulster's more attractive large towns.

Economy
The town is a centre for the timber-frame house building industry with Kingspan Century being the largest of its kind in Europe. It is also the centre of a thriving agri business most notable of which is the mushroom industry. Engineering also features in the region with both Moffett and Combilift major participants in the materials handling market.

There is a campaign to boost tourism by reopening the Ulster Canal in a scheme which would eventually allow boats to travel from towns in Northern Ireland, such as Newry, by way of Monaghan to places as far south as Limerick, as well as Dublin.

Monaghan once had a thriving furniture manufacturing industry. Since 1990, this has diminished greatly under global competition. However, manufacturers such as Rossmore Furniture (which took its name from Rossmore Forest Park, situated just outside the town) continue to operate from the town.

Notable people

Jonathan Douglas, footballer
The Rt Hon. Sir Charles Gavan Duffy, politician and co-founder of The Nation, subsequently the eighth Premier of Victoria,  was born at 10 Dublin Street.
Jim Lynagh, Republican martyr who was a volunteer in the East Tyrone Brigade of the Provisional Irish Republican Army
Juan MacKenna, hero of the Chilean War of Independence
Caoimhghín Ó Caoláin, politician
Nathaniel Walter Swan (1834–1884), Australian writer, was born in Monaghan
William Temple, recipient of the Victoria Cross
Sir William Whitla, politician and physician
Alexander Williams, artist

Sister city
Monaghan is twinned with Miramichi, New Brunswick.

Gallery

See also
List of towns and villages in the Republic of Ireland
Market Houses in the Republic of Ireland
Monaghan United F.C., a local football team

References

External links

Monaghan County Council Homepage
Architecture of Monaghan
Tourism information

 
County towns in the Republic of Ireland
Towns and villages in County Monaghan